Žegulja is a village in the municipalities of Berkovići, Republika Srpska, and Stolac, Bosnia and Herzegovina. The official name of the settlement was an "Upper Poplat".

Geography
Žegulja is a place located in Herzegovina.

Demographics 
According to the Census in 1991, the town had 287 inhabitants.

According to the 2013 census, its population was 55 in the Berkovići part and 11 Bosniaks in the Stolac part.

See also

Berkovići
Eastern Herzegovina

References

External links
Opština Berkovici

Populated places in Berkovići
Populated places in Stolac
Villages in the Federation of Bosnia and Herzegovina